Age is a genus of moths belonging to the subfamily Olethreutinae of the family Tortricidae.

Species
Age arabica Kuznetzov, 1997
Age onychistica Diakonoff, 1982

See also
List of Tortricidae genera

References

External links
tortricidae.com

Eucosmini
Tortricidae genera
Taxa named by Alexey Diakonoff